Roy Sanders may refer to:

 Roy Sanders (American League pitcher) (1894–1963), American baseball pitcher
 Roy Sanders (politician) (1904-1976), American educator and Louisiana state legislator
 Roy Sanders (National League pitcher) (1892–1950), American baseball pitcher